Titagya Schools is a non-profit organization that promotes interactive early childhood education in Ghana's three northernmost regions: the Northern Region, Upper East Region and Upper West Region. Titagya Schools was founded in 2008 by Abukari Abdul-Fatawu, Manzah Iddi Habib and Andrew Garza to address northern Ghana's rural adult literacy rate of 22%. In November 2009, Titagya opened a pre-school for 50 children in Dalun, in the Tolon-Kumbungu District of Ghana. 60% of teaching at the school takes place in English, 40% in Dagbani.

Pedagogy 
Titagya's pedagogical approach is derived to a significant extent from the Reggio Emilia approach. Titagya partners with the government of Ghana and other institutions to reduce the role of rote learning in early education in Ghana, while increasing the role of small group activities, storytime and other activities that encourage critical thinking and social and emotional development.

References 

Education in Ghana
Early childhood education
Northern Region (Ghana)
Upper East Region
Upper West Region
Non-profit organisations based in Ghana
Organizations established in 2008